John Lee Canley (December 20, 1937 – May 11, 2022) was a United States Marine and a recipient of the United States military's highest award for valor, the Medal of Honor, for his actions in January/February 1968 during the Battle of Huế. At the time of this action Canley was a gunnery sergeant with Company A, 1st Battalion, 1st Marines. Canley was originally awarded the Navy Cross but this was upgraded to the Medal of Honor, which was presented on October 17, 2018. The Expeditionary Sea Base USS John L. Canley (ESB-6) is named for him.

Early life
Canley was born in Caledonia, Arkansas, on December 20, 1937.  His father was employed at a chemical plant; his mother worked as a restaurant manager.  Canley was raised in nearby El Dorado.  In 1953, he enlisted in the United States Marine Corps from Little Rock, Arkansas. He retired in 1981.

Military career
On the morning of January 31, 1968, Company A, 1st Battalion, 1st Marines was loaded onto trucks and sent to reinforce United States and South Vietnamese forces under siege in Huế. As the convoy approached the southern suburbs of the city, they began to come under increased sniper fire. In one village, the troops dismounted and cleared the houses on either side of the main street before proceeding. The Marine convoy stopped several times to eliminate resistance in heavy house-to-house and street-to-street fighting before proceeding again. During this fighting the company commander, Captain Gordon Batcheller, was wounded. Gunnery Sergeant Canley assumed command of the company, and he and Sergeant Alfredo Cantu Gonzalez led the Marines in the defense of the convoy, actions for which Gonzalez would later be posthumously awarded the Medal of Honor. At about 15:15 after bloody fighting the Marines managed to make their way toward the besieged Military Assistance Command Vietnam (MACV) compound. Canley was awarded the Navy Cross in 1970.

Sergeant Major Canley retired from the Marine Corps on October 23, 1981.

Medal of Honor 
Representative Julia Brownley sponsored a private bill in Congress for Canley's Navy Cross to be upgraded to the Medal of Honor. On December 21, 2017, the House of Representatives waived the five year time limit for the award of the Medal of Honor, and the Senate later took similar action. Secretary of Defense Jim Mattis recommended the upgrade to President Donald Trump, who approved the award in July 2018. On Wednesday, October 17, 2018, Trump awarded the Medal of Honor to Sergeant Major John L. Canley, United States Marine Corps (Retired), for conspicuous gallantry.

USS John L. Canley
On June 26, 2022, five weeks after Canley's death, the Expeditionary Sea Base USS John L. Canley (ESB-6) was christened at a shipyard in San Diego. His daughter Patricia Sargent performed the christening of the  ship.

Personal life
Canley was married to Viktoria Fenech.  Together, they had one child (Patricia), as well as a stepson (David) from Fenech's previous relationship.  They eventually divorced.  He also had two children with Toyo Adaniya Russeau: Ricky and Yukari.  After retiring from the Marine Corps, Canley resided in Oxnard, California.

Canley died on May 11, 2022, at his daughter's home in Bend, Oregon.  He was 84, and suffered from cancer prior to his death.

Medal of Honor citation

The President of the United States of America, authorized by Act of Congress, March 3, 1863, has awarded in the name of Congress the Medal of Honor to

Awards and decorations

See also

 List of Medal of Honor recipients for the Vietnam War

References

External links

Medal of Honor ceremony

1938 births
2022 deaths
People from Union County, Arkansas
People from Oxnard, California
Burials at Arlington National Cemetery
United States Marine Corps personnel of the Vietnam War
United States Marines
United States Marine Corps Medal of Honor recipients
Vietnam War recipients of the Medal of Honor
African-American United States Navy personnel
Military personnel from Arkansas
21st-century African-American people
African Americans in the Vietnam War
20th-century African-American people
Deaths from cancer in Oregon